Eivind Dale (born 20 July 1955) is a Norwegian civil servant.

He has a cand.agric. degree from the Norwegian College of Agriculture in 1979, and has spent most of his career in the Norwegian Ministry of Local Government and Regional Development. He was promoted to deputy under-secretary of state in 2000 and then permanent under-secretary of state in 2006; the highest-ranking civil position in a Norwegian ministry. He had been acting in the position since 2005.

References

1955 births
Living people
Norwegian civil servants
Norwegian College of Agriculture alumni